Misua (also spelled mee sua or miswa), also known as wheat vermicelli, is a very thin variety of salted noodles made from wheat flour. It originated in Fujian, China. The noodles differ from mifen (rice vermicelli) and cellophane noodles in that those varieties are made from rice and mung beans, respectively.

Description
Misua is made from wheat flour. Cooking misua usually takes less than two minutes in boiling water, and sometimes significantly less.

Culture
Misua is cooked during important festivities, and eaten in mainland China as well in Cambodia, Malaysia, Indonesia, Singapore, Vietnam, Brunei, Thailand, Myanmar, and particularly in both Taiwan and the Philippines, which have the highest populations of Fujianese outside of mainland China. 

Misua signifies long life in Chinese culture, and as such is a traditional birthday food. Because of this, it is often discouraged to chew or cut misua noodles. It is usually served with ingredients such as eggs, tofu, bell peppers, oysters, pig's large intestine, shiitake mushroom, beef, shallots, or scallions, roasted nuts or fried fish.

In Taiwan, there are two forms of misua. The first is plain, while the second has been steamed at high heat, caramelizing it to a light brown colour. For birthdays, plain misua is usually served plain with pork hocks in stewed broth as a Taiwanese birthday tradition. Brown misua can be cooked for prolonged periods without disintegrating in the cooking broth and is used in oyster vermicelli, a dish popular in Taiwan.

See also
Chinese noodles
 List of noodles
Oyster vermicelli
Sōmen

References

Chinese noodles
Fujian cuisine
Philippine cuisine
Taiwanese cuisine
Burmese cuisine
Wheat dishes